Həmzəli (also, Gamzali and Həmzəlli) is a village and municipality in the Qabala Rayon of Azerbaijan.  It has a population of 1,367.

References 

Populated places in Qabala District